Trinity School  is a non-selective, co-educational, day and boarding school in Teignmouth, Devon for children aged 3–19. The school was founded in 1979 as a joint Roman Catholic and Anglican school. Today the school consists of a Nursery, Preparatory Department, Senior Department and Sixth Form, and welcomes day pupils from the surrounding areas as well as boarders from further afield in the UK and all over the world. Its facilities include a heated outdoor swimming pool, sports pitches, and an onsite tennis academy.

History

The site was originally a house of Religious Formation and Studies for the Redemptorist Order of priests and brothers. Buckeridge House, now known as the White House and serves as the school's reception, is thought to have been built between 1820 and 1828. The Fathers extended their property over the years into a monastery, complete with onsite public church, private community chapel and living quarters. These are still in use as the main building at Trinity School.

At the end of the 19th century, the property was offered for sale as it was too large for the student personnel of that time. The estate was bought by the congregation of Notre Dame de Namur who opened it as a boarding school in 1901. The following year the music studio and St Gerard's cloakroom were constructed.

In 1946 the school acquired Oakley House which is approached through the grounds along Farm Lane and initially housed the Domestic Science, the Art room and the Needlework room, as well as additional residential accommodation. Oakley House is now the Preparatory department.

In December 1976 all parents were informed that the Convent School in Teignmouth was to close. It was widely felt that this would be a tragedy and, as a result of the action of some of the parents and the Anglican Chaplain, an attempt was made to save the school. This was eventually achieved through the hard work of a number of interested parents and staff. It was agreed early on that the school should be a Christian foundation and the joint Roman Catholic and Anglican foundation was established with the blessing of the Roman Catholic Bishop of Plymouth and the Anglican Bishop of Exeter, who became the joint Patrons. The name Trinity was eventually chosen since this was the third Christian foundation that had existed on the site. Trinity School opened on schedule in September 1979, as a non-selective, coeducational day and boarding school.

During the 1990s the school almost trebled in size and building developments reflected this increase in demand. The first major building development was the Dr Penn Science Block in 1996, soon followed by the Michael Dobson Block in 1998, which provided Food Technology and Mathematics classrooms, as well as modern new boarding accommodation. The Father Robin Taylor Building (housing Design Technology) was built in 2001 and the Sutton Building in 2005 completed the quadrangle at the top of the School site. The Sutton Building houses the Staff Room, classrooms for the teaching of Art, EAL, English, History and Modern Foreign Languages, as well as the Learning Support Department, officially opened by Olympic gold medallist, Duncan Goodhew, in 2006.

Today the school has approximately 350 pupils, a mix of day pupils from the local area and boarders from the UK and overseas. The layout and extent of the site have given Teignmouth a co-educational school offering an education from pre-prep to A level within the joint Roman Catholic and Anglican Foundation. The School is accredited by the Independent Schools Council and the Head is a member of the Independent Schools Association and the Society of Heads

References

External links
 Official website
 Independent Schools Council

Boarding schools in Devon
Educational institutions established in 1979
1979 establishments in England
Private schools in Devon
Teignmouth